Frederick Albert John Matthews  (4 January 1913 - 14 May 1985) was the Archdeacon of Plymouth from 1962 to 1978.

Matthews was educated at Devonport High School for Boys, Exeter College, Oxford and Wycliffe Hall, Oxford After a curacy at Stoke Damerel he was Vicar of Pinhoe from 1944 to 1961; and Rural Dean of Aylesbeare from 1957 to 1961. He was Vicar of Plympton St Mary from 1961 to 1983; and a Prebendary of Exeter Cathedral from 1978 until his death.

References

1913 births
People educated at Devonport High School for Boys
Alumni of Exeter College, Oxford
Archdeacons of Plymouth
Alumni of Wycliffe Hall, Oxford
1985 deaths